The Thomas Crown Affair is a 1999 American romantic heist film directed by John McTiernan, written by Leslie Dixon and Kurt Wimmer and is a remake of the 1968 film of the same name. Its story follows Thomas Crown, a billionaire who steals a painting from an art gallery and is pursued by an insurance investigator with the two falling in love. It stars Pierce Brosnan, Rene Russo, and Denis Leary.

The film was produced by United Artists and Irish DreamTime and was released on August 6, 1999. It grossed $14.6 million during its opening weekend and $124.3 million worldwide, against a budget of $48 million. It received generally positive reviews from critics.

Plot
Thieves infiltrate the Metropolitan Museum of Art inside an actual Trojan horse, preparing to steal an entire gallery of paintings, but are apprehended. In the confusion, billionaire Thomas Crown – the crime's secret mastermind – steals Monet's painting of San Giorgio Maggiore at Dusk. NYPD Detective Michael McCann heads the investigation into the theft of the $100 million artwork, with the unwelcome assistance of insurance investigator Catherine Banning.

Crown lends a Pissarro to fill the Monet's space in the museum and falls under Banning's suspicion. She persuades McCann to begin surveillance of Crown, deducing that the wealthy playboy is motivated not by money but the sheer thrill of the crime. Banning accepts Crown's invitation to dinner. Before the date, Crown's therapist correctly speculates that he has found "a worthy adversary" in Banning.

At dinner, Banning has a copy of Crown's keys made; she and her team search his home and discover the Monet, which is revealed to be a taunting imitation painted over a copy of Poker Sympathy from the Dogs Playing Poker series. Banning confronts Crown and the two give in to their mutual attraction, spending a passionate night together.
 
Banning and Crown continue their cat-and-mouse game and their trysts, despite McCann's surveillance. Accompanying Crown on a trip to Martinique, Banning realizes he is preparing to run but rejects his offer to join him when the time comes. McCann presents Banning with photographs of Crown with another woman, Anna, complicating her feelings toward the case and her prime suspect. Banning and McCann discover that the fake Monet is in fact an expert forgery that could only have been painted by someone with access to the original; they visit the likeliest forger, Heinrich Knutzhorn, in prison, to no avail, although his body language suggests to them that he recognizes the work.

Later, Banning finds Crown packing his belongings with Anna. He promises Banning his interest lies with her alone, stating that Anna works for him but he would be compromising her to define the nature of their association. Crown offers to return the Monet by putting it back on the wall of the museum, and gives Banning a time and place to meet him when he's finished. Tearfully, Banning leaves and informs McCann.

The following day, the police stake out the museum, waiting to arrest Crown. Banning learns from McCann that the fake Monet was painted by Anna; the imprisoned forger Knutzhorn is her father, a former business partner of Crown, who became her guardian. Crown arrives and advertises his position in the lobby. The police soon realize that Crown expected Banning to turn him in and that he has set up another plot. Before the police can apprehend him, Crown quickly blends into the crowd, aided by lookalikes in bowler hats à la Magritte's The Son of Man. Evading the officers, Crown releases smoke bombs and pulls a fire alarm, setting off the museum's fire sprinklers. His donated Pissarro, hanging in the Monet's place, is washed clean by the sprinklers to reveal the real Monet.

Crown's game is made clear: upon stealing the Monet, Crown had Anna forge the Pissarro over it and "returned" it to the museum. However, Crown has now vanished with another painting--one that Banning had told him she would have selected over the Monet. With the Monet recovered, Banning considers her role in the case concluded; the second missing painting is not covered by her employer. McCann briefly stops Banning to press her for anything she might know, but admits he has since stopped caring whether or not they catch Crown and bids her farewell. Banning then races to meet Crown at the rendezvous, but finds only a bowler-hatted courier who delivers to her the newly-stolen painting. Devastated, Banning has the painting sent to McCann and boards a flight back to London. In her seat after takeoff, she begins to cry when a hand from the row behind extends to her a handkerchief and offers her comfort. Recognizing the passenger's thinly-disguised voice, she turns to find Crown sitting behind her, and the two are passionately reunited.

Cast
 Pierce Brosnan as Thomas Crown, a billionaire and Catherine's lover.
 Rene Russo as Catherine Banning, an insurance investigator and Thomas' lover.
 Denis Leary as Detective Michael McCann, a police detective.
 Fritz Weaver as John Reynolds
 Frankie Faison as Detective Paretti, a police detective.
 Ben Gazzara as Andrew Wallace
 Mark Margolis as Heinrich Knutzhorn
 Esther Cañadas as Anna Tyrol Knutzhorn
 James Saito as Paul Cheng
 Faye Dunaway as Psychiatrist
 Michael Lombard as Bobby McKinley
 Simon Jones as Accountant on phone (uncredited)
 Cynthia Darlow as Daria

Dunaway played the Catherine Banning role in the 1968 original. However, the character's name was Vicki Anderson.

Production
At first, director John McTiernan was unavailable for the project. Pierce Brosnan and his fellow producers considered several directors (including Mike Newell, Andrew Davis, Roger Donaldson) before returning to their original choice. McTiernan then received the script and added his own ideas to the production.

Script amendments
After McTiernan signed on to the project, he changed the theme of the central heist and a number of key scenes. McTiernan felt that contemporary audiences would be less forgiving of Thomas Crown if he staged two armed bank robberies for fun as McQueen did in the original, rather than if he staged an unarmed art heist. He wrote the heist based on the Trojan horse theme and on a technical failure of thermal cameras. McTiernan also deemed a polo match that was used in the original and had been rewritten into the new script to be clichéd, and he wanted a scene that conveyed more action and excitement, not just wealth. He substituted a catamaran race, in which Brosnan performed his own stunts.

References to 1968 film
There are a number of echo references to the original 1968 version of the film. The most obvious is the casting of Faye Dunaway as Crown's psychiatrist; Dunaway portrayed insurance investigator Vicki Anderson in the original. In the remake, "The Windmills of Your Mind" plays during the ballroom scene, as background music in a couple of other scenes, and during the credits at the end; the song earned an Oscar for the original film. Both films share a nearly identical scene with Crown playing high-stakes golf, and in both films Crown pilots a glider for recreation.

Filming
Filming took place in several parts of New York City, including Central Park. The corporate headquarters of Lucent Technologies stood in for Crown's suite of offices. Due to the impossibility of filming scenes at the Metropolitan Museum of Art (the producers' request was "respectfully declined"), the production crew made their own museum on a soundstage. Artisans were hired to create a realistic look to the set. Another scene was filmed in a different city landmark: the main research library of the New York Public Library.

The glider scenes were shot at Ridge Soaring Gliderport and Eagle Field in Pennsylvania and at Corning-Painted Post Airport in New York. The two glider aero-tow shots were taken from film shot at different airports with different tow planes. The initial takeoff was photographed at the Harris Hill Soaring Center located at the National Soaring Museum in Elmira, NY. The glider pilot was Thomas L. Knauff, a world record holder, and a member of the US Soaring Hall of Fame.

A number of McTiernan's vehicles then appear in the next sequence, as well as his farm. The tractor in the background after the glider lands belongs to McTiernan, while the dark green Shelby Mustang that Crown drives on Martinique was originally intended to be used for Arnold Schwarzenegger's character in 1993's Last Action Hero, and was retrieved from the director's garage for this film. The six-wheeled Jeep was built specifically for the film. The house used as Crown's Caribbean getaway is owned by one of the 30 original families who settled in Martinique in the 17th century. The scenes around it, like the beach, are a montage of various other parts of Martinique, including St Pierre and the Lamentin airport.

Paintings
The paintings, copies of which were supplied by "Troubetzkoy Paintings" in New York, appearing in the film are:

 San Giorgio Maggiore at Twilight by Claude Monet, owned by the National Museum and Art Gallery in Cardiff, Wales.
 Wheatstacks by Claude Monet, owned by the Getty Museum in Los Angeles.
 Noon: Rest From Work (After Millet) by Vincent van Gogh – The painting Crown admires and calls "his haystacks," the original is owned by Musée d'Orsay in Paris, France.
 The Artist's Garden at Eragny by Camille Pissarro.
 The Son of Man by René Magritte – The painting that is seen several times in the film depicting a man in a suit with a Bowler hat and an apple covering his face.
 Banks of the Seine at Argenteuil by Édouard Manet – The second painting to go missing, given to, and later returned by, Catherine. It is currently housed at the Courtauld Institute of Art Gallery in London.
 The Intervention of the Sabine Women by Jacques-Louis David, owned by the Louvre  in Paris.
 A painting in the style of Cassius Coolidge's series, Dogs Playing Poker is shown but it is not one of Coolidge's works.

Soundtrack

The soundtrack was composed by Bill Conti and arranged by Jack Eskew. It features a variety of jazz arrangements which harken back to the original film's version. In addition, the film ends with a reprise of the Academy Award-winning song "Windmills of Your Mind" sung by Sting. Throughout the film, Nina Simone's recording of "Sinnerman" (from the album Pastel Blues, 1965) is used in segments. Mostly the non-vocal parts are used (hand-clapping and piano riffs), but in the final scenes, where Crown returns to the scene of the crime, Simone sings "Oh sinnerman, where are you gonna run to?"

Track listing
 "Windmills of Your Mind" – Sting
 "Sinnerman" – Nina Simone
 "Everything (...Is Never Quite Enough)" – Wasis Diop
 "Caban La Ka Kratchie" – Georges Fordant
 "Black & White X 5" – Bill Conti
 "Never Change" – Bill Conti
 "Meet Ms. Banning" – Bill Conti
 "Goodnight/Breaking & Entering" – Bill Conti
 "Glider Pt. 1" – Bill Conti
 "Glider Pt. 2" – Bill Conti
 "Cocktails" – Bill Conti
 "Quick Exit" – Bill Conti

Release

Theatrical
The Thomas Crown Affair premiered on July 27, 1999, and was theatrically released in the United States on  August 6, 1999, by United Artists and Metro-Goldwyn-Mayer.

Home media
The Thomas Crown Affair was released on DVD in the LaserDisc format on January 4, 2000, in the United States by MGM Home Entertainment. The DVD includes comments from director John McTiernan. When the film was broadcast on TBS, the Pepsi One logo on the can, from which Banning drinks, had to be deleted.

Reception

Box office
The Thomas Crown Affair grossed $69,305,181 at the United States box office and a further $55,000,000 in other territories, totaling $124,305,181 worldwide against a budget of $48 million.

Critical response
On Rotten Tomatoes, the film has an approval rating of 70% based on 102 reviews, with an average rating of 6.4/10. The site's consensus states: "Sleek, stylish, and painlessly diverting, The Thomas Crown Affair is a remake of uncommon charm." On Metacritic the film has a score of 72% based on reviews from 23 critics, indicating "generally favorable reviews".

Accolades

Possible sequel
A possible sequel has long been in development hell. In January 2007, it was reported that the sequel would be a loose remake of the 1964 film Topkapi. Pierce Brosnan said in January 2009 that Paul Verhoeven was attached to direct the film. In 2010, Verhoeven said that he had left the project due to script changes and a change in the regime. At one point, both Angelina Jolie and Charlize Theron were rumored for a part in the film, with Brosnan more keen on bringing Theron on board. In April 2013, however, Brosnan cast a doubt on the sequel, calling it "dormant", but claimed he would still like to do it. The initial script was penned by John Rogers from a story he had co-written with Harley Peyton while additional material was provided by Nick Meyer, Michael Finch and Karl Gajdusek.

In the April 2014 edition of Empire, John McTiernan revealed that he had written a script for the sequel, while in prison, called Thomas Crown and the Missing Lioness.

See also
 Heist film

References

External links
 
 
 
 
 
 

1999 films
1999 crime films
Remakes of American films
American crime films
American heist films
Films directed by John McTiernan
Films scored by Bill Conti
Films set in museums
Films set in New York City
Films shot in Martinique
Films shot in New York City
Films with screenplays by Leslie Dixon
Films with screenplays by Kurt Wimmer
Metro-Goldwyn-Mayer films
United Artists films
1990s English-language films
1990s American films